In the mathematical study of rotational symmetry, the zonal spherical harmonics are special spherical harmonics that are invariant under the rotation through a particular fixed axis.  The zonal spherical functions are a broad extension of the notion of zonal spherical harmonics to allow for a more general symmetry group.

On the two-dimensional sphere, the unique zonal spherical harmonic of degree ℓ invariant under rotations fixing the north pole is represented in spherical coordinates by

where  is a Legendre polynomial of degree . This can be obtained by rotation of the basic zonal harmonic 

In n-dimensional Euclidean space, zonal spherical harmonics are defined as follows.  Let x be a point on the (n−1)-sphere.  Define  to be the dual representation of the linear functional

in the finite-dimensional Hilbert space Hℓ of spherical harmonics of degree ℓ.  In other words, the following reproducing property holds:

for all .  The integral is taken with respect to the invariant probability measure.

Relationship with harmonic potentials
The zonal harmonics appear naturally as coefficients of the Poisson kernel for the unit ball in Rn: for x and y unit vectors,

where  is the surface area of the (n-1)-dimensional sphere. They are also related to the Newton kernel via

where  and the constants  are given by

The coefficients of the Taylor series of the Newton kernel (with suitable normalization) are precisely the ultraspherical polynomials.  Thus, the zonal spherical harmonics can be expressed as follows.  If , then

Properties

The zonal spherical harmonics are rotationally invariant, meaning that  for every orthogonal transformation R.  Conversely, any function  on  that is a spherical harmonic in y for each fixed x, and that satisfies this invariance property, is a constant multiple of the degree  zonal harmonic.
Evaluating at  gives

References
 .

Rotational symmetry
Special hypergeometric functions